The Geostationary Defense and Strategic Communications Satellite 2 or SGDC-2 (in Portuguese: Satélite Geoestacionário de Defesa e Comunicações Estratégicas 2) is a Brazilian geostationary communication satellite that is currently in the planning stages. It will launched as a backup to SGDC-1. An open procurement period is being planned as of April 2019; a contract has yet to be signed for the satellite's construction. It will be operated by the Brazilian state-owned company Telebrás and launched no earlier than 2022.

In August 2019, Brazil's federal audit court – the TCU – suspended the open procurement period due to financial and technical irregularities present within the procurement process. Telebrás was asked to address these concerns in order to proceed with the selection of a satellite construction supplier for SGDC-2.

As of July 2021, the procurement of SGDC-2 has been delayed indefinitely due to concerns over cost and the legality of the procurement agreement between Telebrás and Visiona, a joint venture with Embraer.

References

External links 
 SGDC - RESTRIÇÕES DO ITAR E SGDC-2 SÓ EM 2022 Defesanet
 Segundo satélite brasileiro só deve operar em 2022, de acordo com novo cronograma  Teletime

Communications satellites of Brazil
2023 in spaceflight
2023 in Brazil